Stephane Paul Keller (born 20 August 2001) is a Cameroonian footballer who plays as a central defender for Spanish club Deportivo Alavés B.

Club career
Keller was born in Grand Batanga, Keller joined Deportivo Alavés' youth setup in 2018, from AS Fortuna Yaoundé. Promoted to the reserves in Segunda División B ahead of the 2020–21 season, he made his senior debut on 24 October 2020, coming on as a second-half substitute for Sergi García in a 2–0 home win against Arenas Club de Getxo.

On 1 December 2020, Keller renewed his contract until 2024. He made his first team – and La Liga – debut the following 10 January, replacing Rodrigo Battaglia in a 1–3 away loss against Cádiz CF.

References

External links

2001 births
Living people
Cameroonian footballers
Association football defenders
La Liga players
Segunda División B players
Deportivo Alavés B players
Deportivo Alavés players
Cameroonian expatriate footballers
Cameroonian expatriate sportspeople in Spain
Expatriate footballers in Spain